A by-election was held for the New South Wales Legislative Assembly electorate of The Tumut on 17 October 1882 because James Hoskins resigned.

Dates

Result

James Hoskins resigned.

See also
Electoral results for the district of Tumut
List of New South Wales state by-elections

References

1882 elections in Australia
New South Wales state by-elections
1880s in New South Wales